Royal Air Force Shepherds Grove or more simply RAF Shepherds Grove is a former Royal Air Force station located in Suffolk, active from 1943–44 to 1966. Shepherds Grove was host to units of the United States Army Air Forces, Eighth Air Force. During the Cold war it was also one of the 20 Thor IRBM missile bases in the UK, as part of Project Emily.

Units
The following units were here at some point:
 No. 30 Gliding School RAF
 81st Fighter Interception Wing
 No. 82 Squadron RAF
 No. 196 Squadron RAF
 No. 299 Squadron RAF
 No. 1657 Heavy Conversion Unit RAF
 No. 1677 (Target Towing) Flight RAF
 Radio Warfare Establishment became the Central Signals Establishment

See also
List of former Royal Air Force stations
United States Air Forces in Europe
United States Air Force in the United Kingdom

References

Citations

Bibliography

 Ravenstein, Charles A., Air Force Combat Wings Lineage and Honors Histories 1947-1977,  Office of Air Force History, 1984
 Endicott, Judy G., USAF Active Flying, Space, and Missile Squadrons as of 1 October 1995. Office of Air Force History
 Menard, David W., Before Centuries.  USAFE Fighters 1948-1959

External links

The Grover's Site
RAF Shepherds Grove photos
Shepherds Grove at www.controltowers.co.uk
The 1954 Shepherds Grove Album
The 1958 Shepherds Grove Album
Aerial photo from Multimap.Com
RAF Shepherds Grove photos taken in 2006
the UnOfficial 81st SPS RAF Bentwaters/Woodbridge Site the UnOfficial gathering place for the men and women who served in the USAF 81st Security (Air) Police Squadron at RAF Bentwaters and RAF Woodbridge.

Installations of the United States Air Force in the United Kingdom
Royal Air Force stations in Suffolk
Royal Air Force stations of World War II in the United Kingdom
Military airbases established in 1944
Military installations closed in 1966
1944 establishments in England
1966 disestablishments in England